Parizh is a rural locality (a village) in Nizhnekiginsky Selsoviet, Kiginsky District, Bashkortostan, Russia. The population was 25 as of 2010. There is 1 street.

Geography 
Parizh is located 26 km north of Verkhniye Kigi (the district's administrative centre) by road. Nizhniye Kigi is the nearest rural locality.

References 

Rural localities in Kiginsky District